Lake Lucas is a natural freshwater lake in Highlands County, Florida to the north of Sebring.

It is bordered on the north by Maranatha Village retirement community, to the east by a swampy area, to the southeast by Lakeside Cemetery, by a residential area to the south and west, and by pastureland to the northwest. 
The lake has no boat ramps or swimming areas.

References

Lucas
Lucas